McHargue is a surname. Notable people with the surname include:

Darrel McHargue (born 1954), American jockey
 Georgess McHargue (1941–2011), American editor, poet, writer
Keegan McHargue (born 1982), American artist
Rosy McHargue (1902–1999), American jazz musician

See also
McHarg (surname)